Skiffe's Creek is located in James City County an independent city of Newport News in the Virginia Peninsula area of the Hampton Roads region of southeastern Virginia in the United States. It is a tributary of the James River.

Early history 17th-19th centuries
In the early 17th century, Skiffe's Creek bordered Martin's Hundred, a proprietary settlement dating to 1618 in the British Colony of Virginia.  The creek formed one of the borders  between James City Shire and Warwick Shire when they were formed in 1634 by the House of Burgesses as directed by King Charles I. They were two of the eight original shires of Virginia.

For over 300 years, it was part of the boundary between James City County and Warwick County. The latter consolidated into the city of Newport News in 1958. The creek continues to be the dividing line between the two political subdivisions of Virginia.

In 1881, Skiffe's Creek was bridged by a trestle of the new Peninsula Subdivision. The Collis P. Huntington led the development of the Chesapeake and Ohio Railway through the new Church Hill Tunnel and down the Virginia Peninsula through Williamsburg where it finally reached coal piers located on the harbor Hampton Roads, the East Coast of the United States' largest ice-free port. During the ten years from 1878-1888, C&O's coal resources began to be developed and shipped eastward. Coal became a staple of the C&O's business at that time and still does over 125 years later under successor CSX Transportation.

The Lee Hall depot, two miles east of the Skiffe's Creek crossing, was built in 1881-82, and was later expanded. The station served tens of thousands of soldiers based at Fort Eustis during World War I and World War II.

Skiffe's Creek Reservoir 
Skiffe's Creek Reservoir is a portion of the Newport News Waterworks, a regional water provider, owned and operated by the City of Newport News that serves over 400,000 people in the cities of Hampton, Newport News, Poquoson, and portions of York and James City County. 

The regional water system, which initially included an impingement of the Warwick River in western Warwick County, was begun as a project of Collis P. Huntington as part of the development of the lower peninsula with the Chesapeake and Ohio Railway, the coal piers on the harbor of Hampton Roads, and a massive shipyard which were the major sources of industrial growth which helped establish Newport News as an independent city in 1896.

19th-21st centuries 
In the early 20th century, Skiffe's Creek was bridged by U.S. Route 60. Today, most through traffic uses the Interstate 64 or State Route 143. Route 60 primarily links local traffic between the Grove community of southeastern James City County and the Lee Hall community of Newport News. Both communities are attempting to retain their rural appearance even as their respective localities are both being developed. Additionally, a small portion of the expansive Naval Weapons Station Yorktown is in the  Skiffe's Creek watershed.

In the late 20th century, the rural two story frame depot at Lee Hall was saved from demolition by rail enthusiast and rail preservationists. In June 2007, a CSX hopper train derailed at the Skiffe's Creek Trestle, with no injuries.

See also
List of rivers of Virginia

References

External links 
 James City County Watersheds
 Newport News Waterworks

Rivers of James City County, Virginia
Rivers of Virginia
Tributaries of the James River
Bodies of water of Newport News, Virginia